The 1st Jutra Awards were held on March 7, 1999 to honour films made with the participation of the Quebec film industry in 1998. The host of the ceremony was Rémy Girard.

The film The Red Violin (Le Violon rouge) garnered the most nominations, with 11, and the most wins, with nine including Best Picture.

Winners and nominees

References

1999 in Quebec
Jutra
01
1998 in Canadian cinema